Petr Novák may refer to:
Petr Novák (1945-1997), Czech rock musician
Petr Novák, Czech Paralympic athlete 
Petr Novák (born 1982), Czech Olympic skier
Petr Novák (born 1996), Czech swimmer
Petr Novák (born 1988), Czech Greco-Roman wrestler